Christopher Benjamin (born 27 December 1934) is a retired English actor with many stage and television credits since the 1960s. His television roles include three appearances in Doctor Who, portraying Sir Keith Gold in Inferno (1970), Henry Gordon Jago in The Talons of Weng-Chiang (1977) and Colonel Hugh Curbishley in The Unicorn and the Wasp (2008). He also provided the voice of Rowf in the animated film The Plague Dogs (1982).

Early life
Benjamin was born in Trowbridge, Wiltshire, England.

Career
He is well known for his roles in some of the UK's biggest cult television programmes. This included playing the same character ("Potter") in two Patrick McGoohan dramas, Danger Man and The Prisoner, fuelling speculation that they are possibly linked. He played the Old Man (boss of Philip Roath) in the Thames Television comedy by Peter Tilbury, It Takes a Worried Man (1981). He was also an occasional guest star in The Avengers and Doctor Who, making three appearances in each, mostly in comedy roles.

He also played recurring roles in several period dramas. He was Sir John Glutton, the regular adversary in the period family adventure series Dick Turpin, Channing in several episodes of the third series of When The Boat Comes In, and Prosper Profound in the acclaimed 1967 adaptation of The Forsyte Saga. He reprised the role of Henry Gordon Jago, from the Doctor Who serial The Talons of Weng-Chiang in thirteen series of Jago and Litefoot audio plays, after a well received episode of the Big Finish Productions audio C.D. series Doctor Who: The Companion Chronicles entitled The Mahogany Murderers. He acted alongside Trevor Baxter who played Professor George Litefoot. He was Sir William Lucas in the acclaimed 1995 production of Pride and Prejudice.

His few film roles include appearances in Ring of Bright Water (1969), Brief Encounter (1974), Hawk the Slayer (1980), The Tichborne Claimant (1998) and Angel (2007). His final screen appearance was in The Legend of Tarzan (2016).

Predominantly a stage actor, after six years in repertory theatres, Manchester, Salisbury and Bristol Old Vic (1958-1965) he has performed regularly over twenty years with the Royal Shakespeare Company. He has played Bottom five times, at Bristol Old Vic, Regents Park, Radio 3, the RSC (including a tour of Australia and New Zealand) and finally at Glyndebourne in The Fairy-Queen, before retiring from the stage in 2012.
 
His West End performances include How the Other Half Loves at the Duke of Yorks, A Voyage Round My Father at Wyndhams, The Clandestine Marriage at the Queens Theatre, and The Resistible Rise of Arturo Ui at the Saville (with Leonard Rossiter). He has also appeared in several plays at the Donmar, the Kings Head, Mermaid, etc. He has played Falstaff in rep at Salisbury, at Regents Park, and at the Globe in 2008 and after touring the US and UK in 2010.

He has appeared regularly in TV and radio since 1965.

Personal life
Benjamin is now retired, and living in Hampstead, London, with his wife, Anna Fox, an actress and writer.

Selected filmography

References

External links

1934 births
British male Shakespearean actors
English male film actors
English male stage actors
English male television actors
English male voice actors
Living people
People from Trowbridge
Royal Shakespeare Company members